Yannick Mertens (born 25 June 1987) is a professional tennis player from Belgium who mainly has played on the ATP Challenger Tour. On 27 July 2015, he reached his highest ATP singles ranking of 179, and his highest doubles ranking of 363 was reached on 19 September 2011.

Personal life 
He was born in Anderlecht and currently resides in Ternat.

His favorite surface is clay, and he is coached by his father Kris Mertens.

Future and Challenger finals

Singles: 53 (28–25)

References

External links
Official website

1987 births
Living people
Belgian male tennis players
Flemish sportspeople
People from Anderlecht
Sportspeople from Brussels
21st-century Belgian people